Indragiri may refer to:

 Indragiri Hilir Regency, Sumatra, Indonesia
 Indragiri River, Sumatra, Indonesia
 Indragiri Hulu Regency, Sumatra, Indonesia